The Legal Adviser of the Department of State is a position within the United States Department of State.  The legal adviser provides legal advice on all problems (domestic and international) arising in the course of the department's activities.  
The legal adviser heads the State Department's Office of the Legal Adviser. As such, the legal adviser has the rank of Assistant Secretary.

History
From 1870 to 1891, the examiner of claims had been the chief legal officer of the department. The solicitor, a Department of Justice employee, had functioned as the Department of State's chief legal officer from 1891 to 1931. Solicitors and examiners of claims were by statute officials of the Department of Justice.
The position of Legal Advisor was created by an Act of Congress on February 23, 1931 (P.L. 71-715; 46 Stat. 1214). The first legal adviser was Green Hackworth, who served until 1946 and then became a judge on the International Court of Justice.

List of legal advisers of the Department of State

References 

United States Department of State agencies
Government agencies established in 1931
 
United States diplomacy